Nataliconus has become a synonym of the subgenus Conus (Leptoconus) Swainson, 1840 represented as Conus Linnaeus, 1758as stated  the latest classification of the family Conidae by Puillandre N., Duda T.F., Meyer C., Olivera B.M. & Bouchet P. (2015).

These are sea snails, marine gastropod mollusks in the family Conidae, the cone snails and their allies.

Distinguishing characteristics
The Tucker & Tenorio 2009 taxonomy distinguishes Nataliconus from Conus in the following ways:

 Genus Conus sensu stricto Linnaeus, 1758
 Shell characters (living and fossil species)
The basic shell shape is conical to elongated conical, has a deep anal notch on the shoulder, a smooth periostracum and a small operculum. The shoulder of the shell is usually nodulose and the protoconch is usually multispiral. Markings often include the presence of tents except for black or white color variants, with the absence of spiral lines of minute tents and textile bars.
Radular tooth (not known for fossil species)
The radula has an elongated anterior section with serrations and a large exposed terminating cusp, a non-obvious waist, blade is either small or absent and has a short barb, and lacks a basal spur.
Geographical distribution
These species are found in the Indo-Pacific region.
Feeding habits
These species eat other gastropods including cones.

 Genus Nataliconus Tucker & Tenorio, 2009
Shell characters (living and fossil species)
The shell is conical to cylindrical in shape with a conic spire and angular to subangulate shoulders.  The protoconch is paucispiral.  The whorl tops have an enlarged ridge in the center and cords which may die out early or become numerous and small.  Nodules are either absent or die out very early.  The anal notch is deep.  The body whorl is fairly smooth and is ornamented with spiral lines of minute tents, but textile bars are absent.
Radular tooth (not known for fossil species)
The anterior section of the radular tooth is greatly elongated in comparison with the posterior section.  A basal spur is absent, and the barb and blade are short.  The waist is not obvious, and the radular tooth has serrations and a terminating cusp.
Geographical distribution
These species are endemic to the South African region.
Feeding habits
These species are molluscivorus, meaning that these cone snails prey on other mollusks.  These cone snails have been shown to have a preference in prey, and choose to eat mollusks in the family Ranellidae.

Species list
This list of species is based on the information in the World Register of Marine Species (WoRMS) list. Species within the genus Nataliconus include:
 Nataliconus immelmani (Korn, 1998): synonym of  Conus immelmani Korn, 1998
 Nataliconus natalis (G.B. Sowerby II, 1858): synonym of  Conus natalis G.B. Sowerby II, 1858
 Nataliconus royaikeni (S. G. Veldsman, 2010): synonym of Conus royaikeni (S. G. Veldsman, 2010)

References

Further reading 
 Kohn A. A. (1992). Chronological Taxonomy of Conus, 1758-1840". Smithsonian Institution Press, Washington and London.
 Monteiro A. (ed.) (2007). The Cone Collector 1: 1-28.
 Berschauer D. (2010). Technology and the Fall of the Mono-Generic Family The Cone Collector 15: pp. 51-54
 Puillandre N., Meyer C.P., Bouchet P., and Olivera B.M. (2011), Genetic divergence and geographical variation in the deep-water Conus orbignyi complex (Mollusca: Conoidea)'', Zoologica Scripta 40(4) 350-363.

External links
 To World Register of Marine Species
  Gastropods.com: Conidae setting forth the genera recognized therein.

Conidae